Baker Skateboards is an American skateboarding company founded in 2000 by professional skateboarder Andrew Reynolds. The company's main products are skateboard decks, soft goods, accessories, and wheels.

History 
In 1999 Reynolds went to a secret lunch meeting with Tony Hawk & Per Welinder and started Baker Skateboards without J.Strickland's knowledge or any of the original riders. In 2007, the skateboard deck brand signed a distribution deal with Blitz Distribution, the company that, at the time, was distributing Birdhouse and other brands, such as Fury and Hook-Ups (Blitz had originally been formed by Per Welinder and Hawk to distribute their own products). As of 2008, the brand was the top-selling brand under the Blitz Distribution umbrella. In regard to the original Baker logo, Reynolds has credited the design to co-founder J Strickland and stated that it represented a motley company that consisted of talented skateboarders.

Leo Romero left the Baker team in April 2009, and his departure led to a great amount of discussion among skateboarders and fans. Romero was awarded Thrasher magazine's "Skateboarder of the Year" trophy in 2010.

Riley Hawk, son of professional skateboarder and company owner Tony Hawk, joined the Baker team in 2012 after riding for his father's company, Birdhouse.

Baker Zone
The RIDE Channel, a YouTube skateboarding channel cofounded by Hawk, announced on March 15, 2013 that a new series, entitled "Baker Zone", would commence on March 18, 2013. The series features video productions from the Baker company, such as "Weekend Warriors," "Piled Out," "Trash Compactor," and "Dumb Ass Park Footy".

Team

Members of the company's professional skating team include Andrew Reynolds, Kader Sylla, Riley Hawk, Elissa Steamer, Tristan Funkhouser, Zach Allen, Tyson Peterson, Rowan Zorilla, Kevin Long, Jacopo Carozzi, Casper Brooker, and Justin Figueroa. Former team members included Antwuan Dixon, Jim Greco, Erik Ellington, Leo Romero, and Terry Kennedy.

Bakerboys Distribution
In the early 2000’s, Reynolds and fellow professional skateboarders, Jim Greco and Erik Ellington, established Bakerboys Distribution, a company that distributes many brands, some of which are owned by past and current Baker riders:
Baker Skateboards
Shake Junt 
Happy Hour Shades 
Deathwish Skateboards
Volume 4
Heroin Skateboards
Palace Skateboards
Hammers
Death Lens
Illegal Civilization
Ashbury
ABC Hat Co.
Birdhouse Skateboards
Call Me 917
Gnarhunters

Formerly with the Blitz distribution company, Baker's distribution was newly managed by Bakerboys in 2011.

The Palace skateboard brand, which won the "Brand of the Year" award at Europe's Brighton Trade Show in January 2012, announced a distribution deal with Bakerboys in July 2014. The video appeared on the "PWBC News" series that Palace produces.

Deathwish

Deathwish Skateboards company draws its inspiration from 70s and 80s cult movies and kitsch magazine cover artwork. Deathwish Skateboards brand name is inspired by Vigilante justice cult film series Death Wish starring Charles Bronson. Deathwish Skateboards logo is the cross symbol sported by the Street Punk Gang in the movie Death Wish 3. 

In 2016, Deathwish releases a line of seven decks entitled VHS Wasteland. The 8.5 size team deck of this series shows a picture of Charles Bronson and his gun taken from the Death Wish movie as an obvious reference to their namesake.

Former Deathwish professional Antwuan Dixon was imprisoned in mid-2013 and stated in a July 2014 Thrasher magazine interview — conducted by Reynolds and Ellington — that he was scheduled to be released on August 23, 2014. Dixon also explained that he may be released earlier:

They say the 23rd, but I’ve been in this high-school-diploma program so I can get my high school diploma and you get milestone credits. And with these milestone credits you can earn six weeks, which means 42 days off. So if that goes through I should be getting out the beginning of July.

Deathwish released a tribute skateboard deck in June 2014 to provide Dixon with a financial base to rebuild his life after his release from prison. The deck was sold with a letter from Ellington explaining Dixon's situation and his relationship to Deathwish/Bakerboys ("Antwuan is one of the reasons we started Deathwish. He's been here since day one and he'll be here as long as we are."), in addition to a pre-addressed envelope for owners of the decks to be able to send Dixon a letter while he remained in prison.

Heroin
Created by England-born artist Mark "Fos" Foster, the Heroin brand was named after Fos' addiction to "skateboarding." The global premiere of the Heroin skateboards video, Video Nasty, was held in Los Angeles, US on June 27, 2013 and includes parts from Chet Childress, Deer Man of Dark Woods, Daniel Shimizu, Gou Myagi, Rogie, and Tom Day. Foster's debut American art show, "Diamonds And The Rough," was presented at the Kingswell gallery in Los Angeles, US on June 14, 2014.

Palace
Palace Skateboards was founded around 2011 in England, United Kingdom by Lev Tanju, who was part of a London-based skate crew known as the Palace Wayward Boys Choir. Tanju enlisted the assistance of friends like graphic designer Fergus "Fergadelic" Purcell (also design director at Marc by Marc Jacobs) and photographer Will Bankhead to launch the brand. Tanju explained in 2014: "I just wanted to make some skateboards that looked nice and skated nice."

Hammers
Greco's skateboard and clothing brand "Hammers" was launched in October 2014 as part of Bakerboys Distribution. Greco explained in August 2014 that the brand is "based on individuality, the pure moment of creation ... It's just based on creating." In the first Hammers catalog, Greco explains that the company's products are made in the U.S. "...which in turn creates American jobs and manufactures better products."

Videography

Baker Bootleg  (1998)
Baker 2g (2000 )
Summer Tour 2001 (2002)
Baker 3 (2005)
Shake Junt (2005)
Baker Has a Deathwish (2008)
Baker Has a Deathwish Summer Tour Video (2009)
 Shake Junt - Chicken Bone Nowison (2011)
Bake And Destroy (2012) 
The Deathwish Video (2013) 

TRAVELOGUE Baker Tour (2015)
Baker Presents "Certi-Fried Pro Rowan Zorilla" Part (2016)
Baker 4 (2019)
Deathwish - Uncrossed (2020)
Shake Junt - Shrimp Blunt (2022)

References 

American companies established in 2000
Skateboarding companies
Manufacturing companies established in 2000